Dragana Todorović (/  ; born 2 October 1962), better known under the stage name Bebi Dol , is a Serbian and Yugoslav singer and songwriter. Born in Belgrade, she made her solo debut in 1981 with the single "Mustafa". Bebi Dol rose to further prominence and nationwide popularity with her debut album Ruže i krv. She represented SFR Yugoslavia at the 1991 Eurovision Song Contest with "Brazil". She has released four studio albums to date and had a number of hit songs in Serbia and former Yugoslavia.

Early life
Dragana Šarić was born on 2 October 1964 in Belgrade, FPR Yugoslavia, to mother Magdalena, who worked for Television Belgrade and father Milisav, a military jazz musician. Three months after she had been born, the family relocated to Copenhagen, Denmark, and later continued moving across Europe because of her father's job, who performed in American military bases. When Šarić turned seven, they eventually moved back to Belgrade so she can attend school there. She was a student at the Mokranjac Music School.

After graduating from the 14th Grammar School in Belgrade, Šarić started studying anthropology at the University of Belgrade Faculty of Philosophy.

Career

1980s and 1990s: Beginnings and nationwide popularity
In the late 1970s, Šarić made her first professional attempt as a singer alongside fellow-music school students as members of a band called Tarkus. Together they won a competition organized by Radio Belgrade and received an offer to make studio recordings. In 1979, Šarić served as a backing vocalist on the album Samo napred... by the progressive/hard rock band YU Grupa, which was her debut appearance on a record, and in 1980 appeared as a guest vocalist on the 1980 album Vrt svetlosti by the progressive/psychedelic rock band Igra Staklenih Perli.

The following year, she formed short-lived band Annoda Rouge with her boyfriend, guitarist Goran Vejvoda and drummer Ivan Vdović. In 1981, Šarić also made her solo debut with the single "Mustafa", released under PGP-RTB. The 7-inch single, which had been recorded two years prior in collaboration with Saša Habić, included the Oriental music-inspired title track and "Na planeti uzdaha" ("On the Planet of Breaths"). The song "Mustafa" featured a recording of the voice of Slobodan Konjović from the band Kozmetika, who also co-produced the single. Šarić released it under the stage name Bebi Dol, which was given to her by the members of the band Idoli. By the end of the year, Yugoslav music magazine Džuboks declared "Mustafa" the record of the year. After the release of the single, Bebi Dol started working on her debut album, Ruže i krv (Roses and Blood). The songs for the album were composed by herself, with the exception of the traditional song "Sinu Sunca i bratu Meseca" ("To the Son of the Sun and Brother of the Moon"), dating from the 17th century. The mentioned track featured recordings of dialogues by Humphrey Bogart and Ingrid Bergman from the film Casablanca. The album was produced by Saša Habić, who also played bass guitar and keyboards on the recording, and featured appearances by Goran Vejvoda (on guitar), Du Du A members Dejan Kostić (on guitar and bass guitar) and Zoran Zagorčić (on synthesizer), Beograd member Dejan Stanisavljević (on keyboards), Bebi Dol's father Milisav Šarić (on saxophone), Slobodan Marković (on keyboards), Zoran Konjović (on guitar) and Radio Television Belgrade String Ensemble.

In March 1983, Bebi Dol and Lepa Brena were chosen by Radio Television Belgrade to compete at the Jugovizija music festival in Novi Sad in order to represent Yugoslavia at the Eurovision Song Contest 1983 in Munich, West Germany. Her entry "Rudi", which referred to Rudolph Valentino, eventually placed sixth. The song was later that year released on a 12-inch single along with the cover of "Baby Love" by The Supremes. Her first solo concert was held on 13 June 1983 at Atelje 212 theater in Belgrade. Subsequently, Bebi Dol joined Zdravko Čolić on his national tour and then moved to Egypt, where she spent several years performing at the Sheraton Hotel in Cairo. During her time in Egypt, her debut album Ruže i krv was eventually released in late 1983 through PGP-RTB to critical acclaim.

After relocating back to Yugoslavia, Šarić provided singing voiceover for the character of Sonja Savić in Boro Drašković's 1985 movie Life Is Beatufiul and appeared in Žika Mitrović's 1986 film Protestni album (Protest Album). In 1986, she also released the maxi single "Prove To All", which she recorded with Saša Habić. In the following years, she had the award-winning performances at the International Music Fair (MESAM) with "Inšalah" ("Inshallah"), "Slatke suze ljubavi" ("Sweet Tears of Love") and "Kad sreća odlazi" ("When Happiness Leaves") in 1986, 1988 and 1989, respectively. She also portrayed Ophelia in Hamlet, played during 1987 at Titograd National Theatre. In 1989, Bebi Dol also performed at the Gold Malaysian Festival in Kuala Lumpur and collaborated with Neil Rolnick.

She made her return to Jugovizija in Sarajevo, March 1991. There, she ended up winning the contest with "Brazil", which was written by herself and Zoran Vračević. On 4 May, Bebi Dol represented Yugoslavia at the Eurovision Song Contest 1991 held in Rome, Italy, where she received only one point from Malta and thus placed second to last. She was also the last official Eurovision entry from Yugoslavia, as the country de facto ceased to exist later that year. Šarić stated that after Eurovision she lived in Paris where she signed a two year recording contract, but ultimately decided to move back to Serbia due to political instability in her country.

In 1995, Bebi Dol released her second studio album Ritam srca (Rhythm of the Heart). She recorded the album with guitarist Mario Šeparović of the band Psihopolis and keyboardist Laza Ristovski. The album featured songs written by Bebi Dol and Zoran Vračević, as well as Serbian language covers of Madonna's "Take a Bow" (entitled "Pokloni se") and "Over the Rainbow" (entitled "Iznad duge"). The album included hits like the previously released "Brazil" and "Hajde da..." ("Let's..."). At the 1999 "Tomorrow's Children" charity concert organized by UNICEF in Helsinki, Finland, Bebi Dol performed the song "Ruža" ("Rose"), and performed as a member of the choir consisting of musicians from around the world.

2000s-present: Later career in music and television
In 2002, Bebi Dol released her comeback album Ljuta sam... (I'm Angry...), produced by Vlada Marković, under PGP-RTS. The album was, as she stated, dedicated to all the people she lost in her life. A year later in April, she entered the Beovizija 2003 festival with "Tvrdoglava" ("Stubborn"), placing 10th. Same year, she began hosting her own talk show Bla Bla Bebi on TV Art. In late 2006, she released a cover album in English language, entitled Čovek rado izvan sebe živi (One Gladly Lives Out of Himself), through Mascom Records. The following year, she released the live album Veče u pozorištu (A Night at the Theatre) from her concert held at the Terazije Theatre in February 2007. It featured covers from Lenny Kravitz, Simon & Garfunkel, Pink Floyd, Louis Armstrong and Michael Jackson, as well as the songs from her previous release. In 2008, Bebi Dol released a compilation album, entitled ...Pokloni se... (...Take a Bow...).

Since 2009, Šarić has competed in several reality television shows, including Farma, Dvor and Zadruga. During 2017, Bebi Dol was also a contestant on the fourth Serbian season of Your Face Sounds Familiar, winning the first episode as Emeli Sandé. In 2020, she made a cameo appearance in the series Tajkun (Tycoon), directed by Dragan Bjelogrlić, as a folk singer named Martina, performing "Rano je za tugu" ("It's Early to Be Sad"), originally performed by Haris Džinović.

Collaborations
During her career, Bebi Dol made a number of guest appearances. She appeared on albums by YU Grupa, Igra Staklenih Perli, Kozmetika, Leb i Sol, Idoli, Du Du A, Zona B, Bajaga i Instruktori, Oliver Mandić, Massimo Savić and other artists. She has written lyrics for YU Grupa, Cactus Jack, Generacija 5 and other acts.

Personal life
In the late 1970s and early 1980s Šarić dated guitarist Goran Vejvoda, and during the 1980s, she dated singer Massimo Savić, with whom she recorded duet "Sunce sja, trava miriše" ("The Sun Is Shining, the Smell of Grass Is in the Air").

On 27 September 2014, she married Los Angeles-born Serbian professor of Russian language and literature, Aleks Todorović, after four years of dating. It was also reported that she has changed her name to Dragana Todorović.

Legacy
In 2006, the song "Rudi" was ranked No. 43 on the B92 Top 100 Domestic Songs list.

Discography

Studio albums
 Ruže i krv (1983)
 Ritam srca (1995)
 Ljuta sam... (2002)
 Čovek rado izvan sebe živi (2006)

Live albums
 Veče u pozorištu (2007)

Compilations
 ...Pokloni se... (2008)

Singles
 "Mustafa" / "Na planeti uzdaha" (1981)
 "Rudi" (12-inch single; 1983)
 "Inšalah" / "Ruža na dlanu" (split single with Zana Nimani; 1986)
 "Prove To All" / "How Good Not To Love" (1986)
 "Brazil" (1991)

Filmography and television appearances

See also
Popular music in Yugoslavia
Music of Serbia
List of musicians from Serbia

References

External links 

1962 births
Living people
Serbian rock singers
Serbian pop singers
Serbian singer-songwriters
20th-century Serbian women singers
21st-century Serbian women singers
Yugoslav rock singers
Yugoslav women singers
Singers from Belgrade
Eurovision Song Contest entrants for Yugoslavia
Eurovision Song Contest entrants of 1991
Beovizija contestants